Dennis Nana Dwamena, better known as KiDi, (born August 18, 1993) is a Ghanaian afrobeats and high-life singer-songwriter. He is signed to Lynx Entertainment and is best known for his global hit  single Touch It.

Early life 

KiDi was born Dennis Nana Dwamena on 18 August 1993 in Accra, Ghana to Gerald and Beatrice Thompson. He has two younger brothers, Phillip and Elliot. He received his primary school education at St. Anthony's School in Accra and proceeded to Accra Academy for his high school education. He went on to the University of Ghana Legon, where he graduated in 2016 with a degree in Economics and Information Studies.

Music career

Early beginnings and breakthrough 
While studying Economics and Information Studies at the University of Ghana, KiDi's love for music led him to perform on Moonlight Café – a music production that supports upcoming artistes and gives them a platforms to display their talents on University Campuses in Ghana.  He also recorded covers of popular songs.
In 2015, KiDi took a leap of faith by joining the MTN Hitmaker competition. He went on to win the competition and was later signed to Lynx Entertainment. KiDi shot to prominence in 2017 when he released "Say You Love Me" a song he not only composed but also arranged and produced. KiDi established himself as one of the fastest rising stars in Ghana when he released yet another chart-topper titled "Odo" in July 2017, the remix with Nigerian artist Davido and Mayorkun in December 2017, and Adiepena in April 2018.

Artistry 
KiDi has mounted several stages including 2017 Rapperholic Concert, Ghana Music Honors 2017 Edition, December to Remember 2017, S Concert 2017, the 61st Ghana Independence Celebration Show in March 2018 at the Indigo 02 in London.  He has performed on the same stage as many award-winning African artists including Sarkodie, Samini, Shatta Wale, MzVee, WizKid, Tiwa Savage, Efya, and Patoranking.KiDi has also produced several tracks for other artists and co-produced with award-winning Ghanaian producer, Richie Mensah. He has also written for Ghanaian acts including the award-winning MzVee and Adina and has collaborated with artists such as Tic tac, Ko-Jo Cue, Magnom and Kwesi Arthur. KiDi received 6 nominations at the 2018 Vodafone Ghana Music Awards including ‘Best New Artiste’, ‘Afro-pop Song of the Year’ and ‘Male Vocalist of the Year’ and went on to win the award for ‘High-life Song of the Year’ at the awards  in April 2018. He was crowned as the Artiste of the 5th Edition of the 3Music award and VGMA 2022. KiDi currently has 2 studio albums and 1 EP. His debut album, Sugar was released on May 31, 2019. He also released a movie the same year with the album name (Sugar) in Accra, Kumasi, and the UK.

Personal life 
KiDi has a six-year-old son named Zane Dwamena.

Awards and nominations

References

External links 
 Lynx Entertainment

Ghanaian male singers
1993 births
Living people
Alumni of the Accra Academy
University of Ghana alumni
Male singer-songwriters
21st-century Ghanaian male singers
Ghanaian male singer-songwriters